Blairstown may refer to a place in the United States:

 Blairstown, Iowa
 Blairstown, Louisiana
 Blairstown, Missouri
 Blairstown, New Jersey, a township 
 Blairstown (CDP), New Jersey, a census-designated place within the township
 Blairstown Airport
 Blairstown Historic District
 Blairstown station, a railway station